Richard Gardner (1812 – 4 June 1856), was an English member of the United Kingdom Parliament, representing .

Gardner was born in Manchester, the eldest son of Robert Gardner, then a merchant in London.  He attended first Charterhouse School, then Manchester School, then finally Wadham College, Oxford University where he graduated with a BA in 1838, at the same time he joined the Inner Temple and practised as a barrister.  Through this time he spoke about universal suffrage and published some political pamphlets on the subject. He was elected as a Liberal member of parliament for Leicester in 1847 and was defeated in June, 1848, then re-elected in the general election of 1852, and held the seat until his death 4 June 1856.

He married in 1850, Lucy, the only daughter of count de Mandelsloh, minister plenipotentiary from Wurtemberg. He died 4 June 1856 from a heart condition, leaving his wife and two daughters. He is buried in Kensal Green Cemetery.

Works
 An address to the middle and working classes engaged in trade and manufactures throughout the empire on the necessity of union at the present crisis (1842)

References

External links
 
 

1812 births
1856 deaths
People educated at Charterhouse School
Members of the Parliament of the United Kingdom for English constituencies
UK MPs 1847–1852
UK MPs 1852–1857